Arpaçay is a town and a district of Kars Province in the Eastern Anatolia region of Turkey. The population is 2,503 as of 2010. The mayor is Erçetin Altay (AKP).

Azerbaijanis and their subgroups of Terekemes and Karapapaks make up the majority in the town.

Names 
While the Turkish and Azerbaijani names of the town are Arpaçay, it was called Zaruşat until it was officially renamed in 1922.

The town's names in other languages are as follows:

 
 
 
 Kurdish: Zarûşad

Notable natives
 Azer Bülbül, singer

See also
 Lake Kuyucuk

References

Towns in Turkey
Populated places in Kars Province